The Islamic University of Science & Technology is a government university located at Awantipora, Jammu and Kashmir, India. The university has been set up as a centre for higher learning for the people of the Jammu and Kashmir State and its neighbouring regions. Islamic University of Science and Technology is recognised by the UGC and AICTE and is a member of AIU.

The Islamic University of Science and Technology was promulgated by an act of Jammu and Kashmir State Legislative Assembly in November 2005. Islamic University is located 25 km away from the summer capital of the state, Srinagar.
The Chancellor of the university is the Chief Minister, of the State, and its Board is the Board of Directors of the Jammu and Kashmir Muslim Wakf Board. The Executive Council, chaired by the Vice Chancellor, is the executive authority of the university. The strong science and technology curriculum will be complemented by a School of Humanities and Social Sciences. The university focuses on career development and overall personality enhancement and tries to ensure education for leadership.
Since the state of Jammu and Kashmir was turned into a Union territory post 5 August 2019, The Lieutenant  Governor of The UT has assumed the role of chancellor of the university.Jammu and kashmir administration has recently handed over 1350 kanals of land to the university in the vicinity of campus, where the university has planned to make solar park and biodiversity park and further more infrastructure projects in future.In 2021 university got the international standard athletic track.

Schools of study
The university offers undergraduate and postgraduate courses in the following schools of study

 School of Technology There are six undergraduate and three post graduate courses offered under this school.

 School of Business Studies There is one post graduate and one undergraduate programme. At the undergraduate level it is Bachelors in Business Administration (B.B.A.) and at the post graduation level Masters in Business Administration (M.B.A.).

School of Humanities and Social Sciences There are four departments offering four postgraduate courses under this school of study:

Department of Arabic Language and Literature offering MA Arabic Language and Literature

Department of Islamic Studies offering MA Islamic Studies

Department of English Language and Literature offering MA English Language and Literature. The department is also offering course in B.A(Hons.) English Language and Literature for the period of 3 years.

Department of Journalism offering Masters in Journalism & Mass Communication
 
Besides, the university has instituted three centres dedicated to social sciences. These centres are mandated to impart a core curriculum in humanities and offer degree programs and to promote advanced research.

Ibn-Khaldun Centre for Comparative Civilization

 Centre for International Peace and Conflict Studies

 Rinchen Shah Centre for West Himalayan Cultures

 School of Sciences
The School of Sciences is the fourth, and the most recent, school of studies instituted at Islamic University. In keeping with the university's mandate for science and technology education, the school will facilitate the study of natural sciences and promote scientific research and innovation in all areas of natural sciences. The school houses the Department of Mathematics and Mantaqi Center for Science and Society. On the one hand, the school offers a mathematics program geared for today's competitive job market; on the other, it makes a distinctive contribution towards understanding scientific progress and its impact within a wider social, political and historical surrounding.

The school will, in the near future, incorporate degree programs in other natural science disciplines.

School of Technology
The undergraduate courses are

B. Tech Computer Science and Engineering 
B. Tech Food Technology 
B. Tech Electronics and Communication Engineering 
B. Tech Electrical Engineering 
B. Tech Civil Engineering
B. Tech Mechanical Engineering.

The post graduate programs offered are:
Masters in Computer Applications, 
M.Sc. IT 
M. Sc. Food Technology.

Library 

Central library of IUST incepted its operations in 2005 at the academic block of the University and subsequently in 2010 from Skill and Enhancement Training (SET) building. It is now housed in octagonal shaped structure. It has been named as “Rumi Library”. Ground floor of it is housing mini conference cum meeting hall, space for cafeteria and other sections. It has about 50,000 books. It subscribes to about 65 Print journals/magazines and has access to over 12000 journals.  In addition, Rumi Library subscribes to 14 leading national as well as local newspapers. It has a “Book Bank” facility for needy and meritorious students. It maintains “Career Corner” with 638 books for resource seekers.

References

 ogy
 

Universities in Jammu and Kashmir
Educational institutions established in 2005
2005 establishments in India